Darwin Turner, better known by his stage name Choppa, is an American rapper and songwriter.

History

Early career
While as a teenager Choppa worked on his lyrical skills as a hobby, but he felt his destiny was in professional sports. Disagreements with his high school football coach steered him away from sports and Choppa started taking his music career seriously.

2002—03: Choppa Style and Straight from the N.O.
In early 2002, Choppa signed to independent label Take Fo' Records. On October 22, 2002, Choppa released his debut album titled Choppa Style; it was named after his first single "Choppa Style" which became a regional hit in New Orleans.

In early 2003, after hearing about Choppa, Master P signed him to his new label The New No Limit Records which at that time had distribution from Universal Records. Choppa also joined Master P's new group at the time, the 504 Boyz. Choppa & Master P re-recorded the single "Choppa Style" and re-released it as the first single from his second album. The single went on to chart on the US Billboard Hot 100 at number 94. On March 4, 2003, Choppa released his second album titled Straight from the N.O.. This album charted at number 54 on the US Billboard 200. In late 2003, Choppa started his own record label Street Balla Records.

2004—06: Da Real Choppa and Comin' Back Home
In early 2004, after leaving Take Fo' Records & New No Limit Records, Choppa signed to Roy Jones Jr.'s record label, Body Head Entertainment and also joined Roy Jones Jr.'s group Body Head Bangerz. On September 13, 2005, Choppa released his third album titled Da Real Choppa. On July 18, 2006, Choppa released his fourth album titled Comin' Back Home.

2013—present
On September 26, 2013, Choppa released his debut mixtape and first solo project in seven years, titled "Choppa Style".

Discography

Studio albums

Collaboration albums

Mixtapes

Singles

As lead artist

References

External links
Artist Profile at Yahoo! Music
Choppa on Myspace

Living people
African-American male rappers
American male rappers
No Limit Records artists
Rappers from New Orleans
Southern hip hop musicians
21st-century American rappers
21st-century American male musicians
21st-century African-American musicians
20th-century African-American people
Year of birth missing (living people)